The Democratic Republic of the Congo Handball Federation (DRCHF) is the administrative and controlling body for handball and beach handball in the Democratic Republic of the Congo. Founded in 1970, DRCHF is a member of African Handball Confederation (CAHB) and the International Handball Federation (IHF).

National teams
 DR Congo men's national handball team
 DR Congo men's national junior handball team
 DR Congo women's national handball team

References

External links
 Official website  
 DR Congo at the IHF website.
 DR Congo at the CAHB website.

Handball in the Democratic Republic of the Congo
Handball
Sports organizations established in 1970
Handball governing bodies
African Handball Confederation
National members of the International Handball Federation